Adela of Meissen (also Adelheid or Adele) (died 23 October 1181) was a Danish Queen consort, spouse of King Sweyn III of Denmark. She was the daughter of Conrad, Margrave of Meissen, and Luitgard of Ravenstein.

Adela was born in Meissen. She was married to Sweyn in 1152. As queen of Denmark, Adela was not popular, but criticized for influencing her spouse to abandon Danish customs in favour of German ones.

Widowed in 1157, she married count Adalbert III of Ballenstedt.

Issue
Issue with Swein
  Son, died early
  Luccardis, spouse of Margrave Berthold I of Istria.

Issue with Adalbert

 Gertrudis, spouse of Walther of Arnstein

References

 Alf Henrikson: Dansk historia (Danish history) (1989) (Swedish)
 Sven Rosborn (In Swedish): När hände vad i Nordens historia (When did what happen in the history of the Nordic countries) (1997)
Biography in ''Dansk Biografisk Leksikon 1. ed.

	

12th-century births
1181 deaths
House of Wettin
Danish royal consorts
Year of birth missing
12th-century Danish people
12th-century Danish women
Remarried royal consorts
Daughters of monarchs